Sir Thomas Erpingham  (27 June 1428) was an English soldier and administrator who loyally served three generations of the House of Lancaster, including Henry IV and Henry V, and whose military career spanned four decades. After the Lancastrian usurpation of the English throne in 1399, his career in their service  was transformed as he rose to national prominence, and through his access to royal patronage he acquired great wealth and influence.

Erpingham was born in the English county of Norfolk, and knighted when a young man. During the reign of Richard II he served under the King's uncle John of Gaunt, Duke of Lancaster, in Spain and Scotland, and was with Gaunt's son Henry Bolingbroke on crusades in Lithuania, Prussia and the Holy Land. Erpingham accompanied Bolingbroke into exile in October 1398, and was with him when he landed at Ravenspur in July 1399 to reclaim his inheritance as Duke of Lancaster, after his lands had been forfeited by Richard. Bolingbroke rewarded Erpingham by appointing him as constable of Dover Castle and warden of the Cinque Ports, and after ascending the throne as Henry IV he made him chamberlain of the royal household. Erpingham later helped to suppress the Epiphany Rising and was appointed guardian of Henry's second son Thomas. He was a member of the Privy Council, acting at one point as marshal of England. He attempted to have Henry le Despenser, the anti-Lancastrian bishop of Norwich, impeached as a rebel.

On becoming king in 1413, Henry IV's son Henry of Monmouth appointed Erpingham as steward of the royal household. Henry IV's reign had been marked by lawlessness, but Henry V and his administrators proved to be unusually talented, and within twelve months law and order had been re-established throughout England. In 1415 Erpingham was indentured to serve as a knight banneret, and joined Henry's campaign to recover his lost ancestral lands in France and Normandy. Erpingham presided over the surrender of Harfleur. On 25 October 1415 he commanded the archers in the Battle of Agincourt, where he was positioned alongside the king.

Erpingham married twice, but both marriages were childless. He was a benefactor to the city of Norwich, where he had built the main cathedral gate which bears his name. He died on 27 June 1428, and was buried in Norwich Cathedral.

Ancestry and early life
Thomas Erpingham was born in about 1357, the son of Sir John de Erpingham  of Erpingham and Wickmere in Norfolk, England. His grandfather, Sir Robert de Erpingham was recorded as holding Erpingham manor in 1316  and Erpingham and Wickmere in 1346. Sir Robert represented Norfolk in Parliaments during the 1330s and 1340s. In 1350, Sir Robert and his son Sir John de Erpingham both witnessed a deed of feoffment by Nicholas de Snyterle, rector of "Matelask" (Matlaske near Erpingham), to Philip Tynker and Maud his wife of a messuage there.

Sir John owned a house in Norwich in Conisford Lane, now King Street. Thomas, who would have known the house, was possibly born there. The identity of Erpingham's mother is not mentioned by his biographers. In September 1368 he may have travelled with his father to Aquitaine in the service of Edward the Black Prince. 

His grandfather died in 1370, after 8 March but before 1 August, the date of death of the father of Thomas. On 8 March 1370 at Erpingham, Sir Robert de Erpingham and his son Sir John, both signed their names and left seals on a charter of an inescutcheon between eight martlets. In his will, Robert left legacies to all the friars of Norwich. He was buried near the south door of Erpingham church. Sir John de Erpingham succeeded his father Robert, but did not survive him long, dying later that same year on 1 August 1370. He was buried in the church at Erpingham in the east end of the south isle.

Early career

Early military service

Erpingham served under William Ufford, 2nd Earl of Suffolk in 1372 and was with Suffolk in France the following year. In 1379 he was serving under the Captain of Calais, William Montagu, 2nd Earl of Salisbury. In the summer of 1380 he was indentured into the retinue of John of Gaunt, Duke of Lancaster, a military leader and the third surviving son of Edward III of England, with whom Salisbury had recently served. Indentured retainers gave their allegiance for life in a personal written contract—conditions of service and payment were agreed, and these were rarely relaxed.

The year Erpingham was knighted is unknown, but he is likely to have been at least 21. In June 1380 he was named as 'Sir Thomas' in an order of payment made by Lancaster, the earliest known date at which his knighthood is referred to. The payment, provided by the ducal manor of Gimingham, was for a considerable annual income of £20—it has been estimated that during the 15th century only 12,000 households in England had an income of between £10 and £300. Erpingham was with Lancaster during the English invasion of Scotland in 1385.

Lancaster's determination to rule the Kingdom of Castile after his marriage to the Castilian princess Constance in 1371 dominated his life for 15 years. In 1386 Richard II of England agreed to release the funds needed for Lancaster to lead a Castilian campaign. Lancaster's royal status gave him a prominence in affairs of state that created tension between him and Richard, and the cost of the Castilian campaign was seen by the King's advisers as a price worth paying for the political freedom Richard would gain from Lancaster's absence.

Erpingham was with Lancaster when his army set sail from Plymouth in July 1386. It landed at Brest, France, and temporarily relieved the besieged English garrison. After leaving Brest the army arrived at A Coruña, and went on to bring Galicia under English control. John I of Portugal joined with Lancaster in March 1387, but because of a lack of food for their animals, and the successful defensive tactics employed by the Castilians, their campaign was abandoned after six weeks. In 1388, Erpingham participated  before Charles VI of France in a jousting tournament at Montereau, his adversary being Sir John de Barres. As related by the French chronicler Jean Froissart, half way through the tournament, Erpingham was struck violently on his shield by his opponent, and was knocked off his horse. Stunned by the blow, he managed to recover and continue the joust, "to the satisfaction of the king and his lords".

Erpingham was sent back to England to watch over Lancaster's son Henry Bolingbroke and went into his service. In 1390 he was with Bolingbroke's retinue when it crossed the English Channel  with the intention of joining Duke Louis II of Bourbon in a siege of the Tunisian port of Mahdia on a crusading expedition via Marseilles. The expedition was abandoned when Charles VI refused him permission to travel through France. Bolingbroke then went on a crusade in Lithuania. Erpingham, one of the most trusted and experienced of Lancaster's men, belonged to what the historian Douglas Biggs describes as "the 'adult' portion of Henry's force"—older men who were probably sent by Lancaster to guide and protect his son. The "crusade" resulted in an unsuccessful siege of Vilnius and the capture of Lithuanian women and children, who were then converted to Christianity. It is not known if Erpingham was present with Bolingbroke at the siege.

Erpingham was with Bolingbroke when he returned unnecessarily to Prussia in July 1392—a peace was being made in Lithuania between its ruler, Władysław II Jagiełło, and his cousin Vytautas, and the crusaders who had supported Vytautas had already left. Bolingbroke and his reduced retinue journeyed through Europe and the Near East, visiting Prague, Vienna, Corfu, and the Holy Land. It is thought that it was in Italy that Erpingham obtained the silk for the chasuble which bears his name, now in the Victoria and Albert Museum.

Revolution of 1399 
The historian Helen Castor has described the Lancastrian presence in East Anglia as a "disparate collection” that lacked coherence or a single identity. Erpingham rose to become the most important of Lancaster's retainers in the region. He was appointed to a commission of peace, and given powers to preserve order in Norfolk in the aftermath of the Peasants' Revolt in the summer of 1381. He had a part in supervising the defence of Norfolk in 1385, when a French invasion seemed imminent. In 1396 Lancaster granted him the legal right to use the land within the hundred of South Erpingham, a reward for his loyal service to the Duchy of Lancaster.

In January 1398 a dispute erupted between Bolingbroke and Thomas de Mowbray, 1st Duke of Norfolk, after Mowbray had attempted to ambush and kill Lancaster, and which the King ordered be settled by a trial by battle between the two men. During the five months before 16 September, the day the trial was due to take place, Bolingbroke travelled throughout England on a tour of the Lancastrian lands. Richard stopped the contest as it was about to begin and banished Bolingbroke from the kingdom for ten years, and exiled Mowbray for life. Those assembled were told that the trial had been stopped to avoid dishonouring the loser and to prevent a feud from arising, but chroniclers (writing after Henry IV's accession) considered Richard's decision an act of revenge. Bolingbroke, as one of the five Lords Appellant, had rebelled in November 1387; for a year they maintained Richard as a figurehead with little actual power.

Erpingham was one of 17 named companions who volunteered to accompany Henry Bolingbroke into exile. He entrusted his lands and property to Sir Robert Berney and others. The party headed for Paris, where they were welcomed by Charles VI and presented with lavish gifts. Following the death of his father on 3 February 1399, Bolingbroke's inheritance was confiscated by Richard, and his banishment was increased by the King to life. On 17 June 1399, Erpingham witnessed a secret pact made in Paris between Bolingbroke and Louis I, Duke of Orléans, the brother of Charles VI, stating that as allies they would support each other against each other's enemies—the kings of England and France excepted.

Erpingham was one of Bolingbroke's supporters who landed with him at Ravenspur, probably at the end of June 1399. Whilst Bolingbroke was gaining support for his cause to restore his rightful inheritance of the Duchy of Lancaster as he moved across northern and central England, Richard was delayed in Ireland. He eventually found ships to cross the Irish Sea, and reached Wales by around 24 July. Realising the strength of the threat posed by his rival, he deserted his court and moved across country with a small group of followers.

By 27 July Bolingbroke had reached Berkeley, near Bristol, where he had a meeting with Richard's uncle the Duke of York. At Berkeley, York deserted the King's cause and joined Bolingbroke. Shortly afterwards, Erpingham arrested Henry le Despenser, bishop of Norwich and one of the few remaining supporters of Richard prepared to resist Bolingbroke.

Richard had reached Conwy Castle when Chester fell to Bolingbroke on 5 August. The King was persuaded by the Earl of Northumberland to leave Conwy and travel  to Rhuddlan Castle, but during the journey his party was ambushed and he was taken prisoner. According to a French chronicle, the ambush was devised by Northumberland and carried out by his men, led by Erpingham. When Richard saw armed men everywhere, Northumberland's plans were revealed to him, and: "As he spoke, Erpingham came up with all the people of the Earl, his trumpets sounding aloud." Taken to London under armed guard and kept under Erpingham's custody in the Tower of London, Richard was given no option by Bolingbroke and his representatives—including Erpingham—but to relinquish the throne.

Erpingham was given two important positions at court by Bolingbroke. He was made lord warden and constable of Dover Castle as early as 21 August, and appointed to be chamberlain of the royal household after Henry's accession, a post which made him the head of the royal household with overall responsibility for the arrangement of Henry's domestic affairs, and which he held until 1404. His appointment as lord warden and constable involved the command of a garrison at the castle, and gave Erpingham a position in the King's council when strategic matters were discussed; as constable, he was paid over £300 a year.

Career under Henry IV

Henry's coronation took place on 13 October 1399 at Westminster Abbey. As part of the ceremony, Erpingham carried one of the King's swords during the procession to the abbey. He was one of 11 men who petitioned Henry in person to have Richard killed. Erpingham supervised the execution of two of the leading rebels, Sir Thomas Blount and Sir Benedict Kely. As Blount watched his own bowels being burnt before him, he cursed Erpingham for being a "false traitor":

Henry rewarded Erpingham with the custody for life of a house called 'le Newe Inne' in London. The following year, Erpingham was appointed as guardian of the King's second son, Thomas, Duke of Clarence, and in about 1401 he was appointed to the Order of the Garter. He acted briefly as steward of the royal household the same year and became acting marshal of England in October. In July 1407 the Duke of Burgundy was authorised to negotiate a permanent peace settlement between the French and the English. A mission led by Erpingham went to Paris the following month, and were lavishly entertained by members of the French king's council.

Despite the military nature of the office of constable of Dover, Erpingham took little part in the warfare of the early years of Henry IV's reign, and he generally remained at court. He campaigned in Scotland in August 1400, when Henry made a futile attempt to make the Scots acknowledge him as king of England and pay him homage.

According to one tradition, Erpingham was a supporter of John Wycliffe's English translation of the Bible, which was considered heretical. Supposedly, Erpingham was spared from persecution by the Church because he was favoured by Henry IV, and so merely paid a fine, which financed the construction of the Erpingham Gate. The historian Veronica Sekules considers it unlikely that Erpingham supported Wycliffe, and suggests that if he had such a dispute with the Church, it was more likely over Erpingham's arrest of Despenser.

Power and influence in Norfolk

Sir Thomas Erpingham was one of Henry IVs closest associates, and after 1399, influence in Norfolk shifted from Despenser to Erpingham and his friends. Due to his local connections, his links with the Duchy of Lancaster and his position in the centre of government, Erpingham held a prominent position in East Anglian society; he was named to every commission of the peace in Norfolk during the reign of Henry IV. During the 1400s, Erpingham's authority in north Norfolk was extended to other parts of the county and into Suffolk. Gentry from East Anglia who were associated with Erpingham benefited from his powerful position at court: Sir John Strange of Hunstanton became controller of the royal household in 1408; Sir Robert Gurney of Gunton became Erpingham's deputy at Dover Castle in 1400; and John Winter of Barningham became controller of Prince Henry's household in 1403. Other beneficiaries of Erpingham's friendship included Sir Ralph Shelton, John Payn, and John Raynes of Overstrand, who succeeded Payn as the constable of Norwich Castle in 1402.

The principal citizens of Norwich had become disillusioned with Richard II's policies, the city having lost its charter in 1388 when it supported the Lords Appellant.
Despenser had remained within his diocese after Henry's coronation, but his nephew Thomas Despenser, 1st Earl of Gloucester had been executed for his part in the Epiphany Rising. Erpingham attempted to have Despenser impeached for actively supporting the rebels; at Erpingham's suggestion, Norwich petitioned Henry with charges against Despenser, which were presented to the King by Erpingham.

At Despenser's hearing in London, Erpingham was publicly congratulated by the King for his loyalty to the Crown. Despenser was forced to accept Henry's authority and publicly rebuked; he was later pardoned. Henry awarded the city a new charter, and Norwich showed its gratitude by showering Erpingham with lavish gifts "for bearing his word to the King for the honour of the city and for having his counsel". The city authorities cooperated with him as an important member of Henry's inner circle.

Career under Henry V
Henry IV died at Westminster on 30 March 1413, and was succeeded by his son Henry of Monmouth, the Prince of Wales. Monmouth had replaced Erpingham as warden of the Cinque Ports in 1409, but relationships between the two men remained good, and after the coronation on 9 April 1413, Erpingham was appointed steward of the household, a post he held until at least 1415. After Henry IV's reign, which had been marked by banditry and rioting, Henry V acted quickly to restore law and order throughout the country. This was achieved within a year. Henry's administrators—Erpingham included—were unusually talented, and order was maintained in England throughout his reign.

Henry's great-grandfather Edward III had lost Aquitaine in 1337 when it was confiscated from the English by Philip VI of France, and as a grandson of Philip IV of France, Edward had a claim to the French throne. In November 1414, Henry launched a campaign to recover Aquitaine and France. It was an effective way of establishing his authority as king at the start of his reign. Strategic planning for the expedition in February 1415 involved discussions with Erpingham and other soldiers in Henry's inner circle, part of what the historian Anne Curry describes as the King's "strong infrastructure and amply supply of manpower". Erpingham was indentured to serve as a knight banneret. His retinue, which mustered on heathland outside Southampton where they obtained provisions, consisted of two knights, 17 squires and 60 archers.

Participation at Harfleur and Agincourt

Erpingham crossed over from England to Normandy with Henry's army on 11 August 1415. The King's ship reached the mouth of the River Seine on 13 August, and the army landed  from Harfleur, a landing point likely to have been decided on beforehand. Erpingham's men were present during the siege of the town, and on 22 September he led the procession to the walls and presided over the truce that led to its surrender. The English army then marched towards Calais, shadowed by the French, who forced them to divert away from the coast. The English successfully forded the River Somme at Voyennes;  two days' march short of Calais, they were blocked by the French near Agincourt.

Erpingham was one of the middle-aged English commanders on the field at Agincourt, and at 60 was one of the oldest men present. Although having never experienced a pitched battle before, he had taken part in lesser actions and, as noted by Curry, was "undoubtedly one of the most experienced soldiers present" at Agincourt. He is not mentioned in any contemporaneous English versions of the battle, but three French chroniclers, Jean de Wavrin, Enguerrand de Monstrelet and Jean Le Fèvre, all give detailed descriptions of his role in the battle. The three main divisions (or 'battles') of the English army were commanded by Henry and two veteran soldiers: the rearguard (to the right of the King) was led by Thomas Camoys, 1st Baron Camoys; and the vanguard (on the King's left) was led by Edward, Duke of York.

The battle
On 25 October, the day of the battle, the English army was in position by dawn. With both of its flanks protected by the woods of Tramecourt and Azincourt, the army consisted of 5,000 archers and 800 dismounted men-at-arms—in proportion to the number of men-at-arms present, the number of English archers was high. Because of the authority his seniority would carry, Erpingham was given command of the archers. The men-at-arms were positioned fours ranks deep in the centre of the gap between the two woods. Most of the archers were positioned on the flanks of the men-at-arms, but a few archers were placed amongst them, and 200 were hidden in a clearing in the Tramecourt woods, close to the French lines. The stakes gave protection against a charge by the French cavalry.

After the French army failed to attack, Erpingham was ordered to warn the army that it was about to advance to within bowshot of the French. He threw his baton upwards as a signal to advance, and commanded "Now strike!". Erpingham's strong Norfolk accent may have caused the French to mishear him, as some chroniclers recorded the command as "Nestroque". He then dismounted and moved with his banner to join the King, where he remained during the rest of the battle.

When the English advanced with a great shout, the French responded by beginning their own advance, each army moving roughly the same distance. The English paused and the main body of archers replanted their stakes. They then began to continuously discharge their arrows, which signalled the concealed archers to start firing into the French flanks. The French plan was to use mounted men-at-arms to overcome the English archers, leaving the battles and the men in the wings to attack their heavily outnumbered English counterparts. This plan failed when the cavalry were halted by the storm of arrow fire and the stakes planted by the archers; their retreat was disrupted by the advancing French foot soldiers. The chaos that ensued allowed the English men-at-arms to penetrate the French battles.

The ensuing  was the most important part of the battle. Once the men-at-arms in the two armies engaged, the English archers fired into the flanks of the French. Evidence suggests the English vanguard, led by York, who was killed, bore most of the fighting. Advancing through deep mud, the French were exhausted when they reached the English. Those killed or knocked down at the front hindered others behind them, causing men to pile up. The immobilised French were killed where they stood, the English suffering far fewer casualties. Any of the French attempting to retreat were blocked by their advancing comrades; if they tried to move to the flanks they were targets for the English archers. This, and their failing position to their front, caused the French to break, and many were cut down or captured by pursuing English archers and men-at-arms. Not all the French had engaged in the fighting and only the vanguard had been defeated. When much of the main French battle were destroyed by the English men-at-arms and the re-armed archers firing into them, the largely leaderless French army withdrew from the field, except for a group of 600 men who were killed or captured when they charged the English.

Aftermath of the battle
After the battle, Henry's army marched to the English enclave of the Pale of Calais, embarked from Calais on 16 November and returned to England. Erpingham was among 300 men-at arms—which included four barons and 22 knights—and 900 archers who garrisoned the town over the winter. The seniority of the men-at-arms was a reflection of how important it was to Henry that the town was not lost to the French.

On his return to England, Erpingham's reward for the services he rendered had during the war included the farm of Lessingham manor and an annuity from the King of 50 marks. In July 1416, in his capacity as the steward of the royal household, he travelled back to Calais with John Wakering, the bishop of Norwich. There they welcomed the Duke of Burgundy, before his meeting with King Henry.

Personal life

When staying in Norwich, Erpingham and his family and servants lived in a large house located between Norwich Cathedral and the River Wensum, with his land going down to the river. The house was acquired from Sir Robert Berney in 1409. Known variously as 'Berney's Inn', 'the Erpingham' or 'Calthorpe's House', it was only accurately located in 1981. No remains survive, although it was a major source of employment for the local area during the time that it was occupied by Erpingham. It was inherited by his niece. In the 17th century, the house and its associated land was subdivided and built upon.

Erpingham's connections with the Lancastrians and his increasing wealth led to his acquisition of lands, rents and services in Norfolk, Suffolk and Essex, manors sometimes being held in joint possession with his neighbours or relatives. Curry lists over 40 manors he held during his life, some permanently: three were inherited from his father, such as the manor at Erpingham; seven came to him during the 1370s and 1380s; eight manors were given to him in 1399 by Henry IV and a further seven were acquired that year by other means; another seven were acquired during the 1400s; and he purchased twelve manors from 1410 to 1421. He also lost the tenure of some of his lands, a common occurrence at the time when manors were awarded 'for life'; the hundred, which included his home village, was lost in 1398, when King Richard gave to Katherine Swynford, third wife of the Duke of Lancaster, "the manors of Erpingham and Wyckmere, and of all lands, rents, services, villeins with their villeinages etc. there and in all other towns in Norfolk sometime of Robert Erpingham knight". In 1407 Berney helped Erpingham to buy the manor at Blickling. His family sold Blickling to the soldier Sir John Fastolf in 1431.

Erpingham married Joan Clopton, the daughter of Sir William Clopton of Clopton, Suffolk, sometime before 1389; Erpingham was widowed in 1404. His second marriage was to Joan Walton, the daughter of Sir Richard Walton, and widow of Sir John Howard, who died in 1409 or 1410. Joan died in 1425. Evidence that Erpingham was twice married comes in part from a window opposite the chantry of Norwich Cathedral, which once displayed him and his two wives, as well as church records, which state he was buried with both of his wives. Both marriages were childless.

Erpingham had a profound influence on the careers of the two sons of his sister Julian, who married Sir William Phelip (or Philip) of Dennington. Erpingham's position in court helped the elder son William to become a member of Henry IV's personal household; William's brother John held a similar position at the court of Henry of Monmouth. The brothers remained closely attached to their uncle. William and Erpingham were often recorded as co-feoffees of estates in East Anglia, and William stood surety for his uncle at the Exchequer. The family's fortunes improved still further when Henry of Monmouth became king, although John died at Harfleur in 1415. His brother was knighted on the eve of the coronation and later fought at Agincourt.

From 1417, Erpingham seems to have retired and lived out his remaining years in Norfolk, having relinquished his position as steward that May. King Henry died in 1422, after which Erpingham had no further contact with the court. He died on 27 June 1428, and was buried on the north side of the presbytery of Norwich Cathedral. Sir William Phelip, who was an executor of his uncle's will, "inherited his substantial possessions in Norfolk". Dated 25 Mar 1427, the will contains bequests to Norwich Cathedral, churches in Norfolk and London, two Norwich hospitals and several East Anglian convents. Erpingham specified that "all my armour and the harness of my person to be delivered up to the Holy Trinity [Cathedral] in Norwich".

Architectural legacy

Erpingham was a benefactor to the city of Norwich. In 1420 he had built the cathedral gate which bears his name, opposite the west door of Norwich Cathedral leading into Cathedral Close. He funded the rebuilding of the Church of the Blackfriars in Norwich after a fire in the city caused serious damage to the original friary complex in 1413. Today it forms part of the most complete friary surviving in England. The west tower of St. Mary's Church, in the village of Erpingham, was paid for by him.

In 1419, Erpingham paid for the east chancel window of the church of St. Austin's Friary in Norwich to be glazed. The window contained eight panes, containing dedications to 107 noblemen or knights who died without producing an heir since the reign of Edward III. The building was demolished in 1547 after the priory was suppressed in 1538.

Appearance in the Henriad
Sir Thomas Erpingham appears twice in Act IV of William Shakespeare's play Henry V, first printed in 1600, and is mentioned (but does not appear) in Act II of Richard II. According to the Shakespearean scholar Thomas M. Cranfill, Erpingham plays a "considerable, affecting role". Just after the beginning of Scene 1, Erpingham enters and is acknowledged by the King. As the old man departs, Henry replies (probably out of Erpingham's hearing), "God-a-mercy, old heart! thou speak'st cheerfully", a line, as historian Lawrence Danson writes, "poised at gratitude and irony, admiration and desperation": Later in the same scene, Erpingham re-enters to inform the King that his nobles are looking for him, and in a simple line conveys the burden of being a ruler. Erpingham is a counterpart to the character of John Falstaff, his brief appearance in the Henriad contrasting with the much larger part given to Falstaff. Henry emphasises the knight's old age and marks him apart by consistently referring him by his full name, and the character is used to accentuate the connection between old age and goodness.

In film depictions of the play, Erpingham's part is largely silent, as in Laurence Olivier's film of 1944. Erpingham first appears near the end of the film, during the night before the battle of Agincourt. Kenneth Branagh, in his 1989 film, used the character more often and in, according to Curry, in a way that was "notably more inventive" than Olivier and showed more of an awareness of Erpingham's place in history. Identifiable in both films by his distinctive coat of arms and his white hair—in contrast with that of the youthful looking Henry and his courtiers—Branagh includes Erpingham to good effect in the court scenes set in England, as well as during the battle and its aftermath. The character is given a more central (if largely silent) role by Branagh, without distorting Shakespeare's original intentions for the part.

Notes

References

Sources

Further reading

External links

 The Erpingham Window in Norwich Cathedral, made to commemorate Sir Thomas (Norwich Heritage).
 Erpingham Dig'Educating people about the story of Sir Thomas Erpingham' at the village of Erpingham
 Sir Thomas Erpingham's speeches (and cues) in William Shakespeare's play Henry V, from George Mason University's Open Shakespeare website.
 Record of the "Particulars of the account of Thomas Erpyngham" from the National Archives at Kew

1355 births
1428 deaths
14th-century English military personnel
Lords Warden of the Cinque Ports
Knights of the Garter
People from North Norfolk (district)
People of the Hundred Years' War
Burials at Norwich Cathedral